Project Timberwind aimed to develop nuclear thermal rockets. Initial funding by the Strategic Defense Initiative ("Star Wars") from 1987 through 1991 totaled $139 million (then-year). The proposed rocket was later expanded into a larger design after the project was transferred to the Air Force Space Nuclear Thermal Propulsion (SNTP) program.

The program underwent an audit in 1992 due to security concerns raised by Steven Aftergood. This highly classified program provided the motivation for starting the FAS Government Secrecy project.  Convicted spy Stewart Nozette was found to be on the master access list for the TIMBER WIND project.   

Advances in high-temperature metals, computer modelling and nuclear engineering in general resulted in dramatically improved performance.  Whereas the NERVA engine was projected to weigh about 6803 kg, the final SNTP offered just over 1/3 the thrust from an engine of only 1650 kg, while further improving the specific impulse from 930 to 1000 seconds.

History

In 1983, the Strategic Defense Initiative ("Star Wars") identified missions that could benefit from rockets that are more powerful than chemical rockets, and some that could only be undertaken by more powerful rockets. A nuclear propulsion project, SP-100, was created in February 1983 with the aim of developing a 100 KW nuclear rocket system.

From 1987 to 1991 it was funded as a secret project codenamed Project Timber Wind, which spent $139 million. The proposed rocket project was transferred to the Space Nuclear Thermal Propulsion (SNTP) program at the Air Force Phillips Laboratory in October 1991.  NASA conducted studies as part of its 1992 Space Exploration Initiative (SEI) but felt that SNTP offered insufficient improvement over NERVA, and was not required by any SEI missions. The SNTP program was terminated in January 1994, after $200 million was spent.

Timberwind Specifications

Timberwind 45 on Timberwind Centaur
 Diameter: 13.94 ft (4.25 m), Length: 23.87 m 
 Nr of engines : 1
 Vacuum thrust: 99208 lbf (441.3 kN)
 Sea level thrust: 88305 lbf (392.8 kN)
 Vacuum specific impulse: 1000 s
 Sea level specific impulse: 890 s
 Engine mass: 3300 lb (1500 kg)
 Thrust to Weight Ratio: 30
 Burn time: 449 s
 Propellants: Nuclear/LH2

Timberwind 75 on Timberwind Titan 
 Stage Diameter: 6.1 m (20 ft)  Length: 45.50 m
 Diameter: 5.67 ft (2.03 m) 
 Nr of engines : 3 
 Engine :
 Vacuum thrust: 165347 lbf (735.5 kN)
 Sea level thrust: 147160 lbf (654.6 kN)
 Vacuum specific impulse: 1000 s
 Sea level specific impulse: 890 s
 Engine mass: 5500 lb (2500 kg)
 Thrust to Weight Ratio: 30
 Burn time: 357 s
 Propellants: Nuclear/LH2

Timberwind 250 stage and engine
 Diameter: 28.50 ft (8.70 m). Length: 30.00 m
 Nr of engines : 1
 Vacuum thrust: 551,142 lbf (2,451.6 kN).
 Sea level thrust: 429,902 lbf (1,912.0 kN)
 Vacuum specific impulse: 1,000 s.
 Sea level specific impulse: 780 s.
 Engine mass: 8,300 kg (18,200 lb).
 Thrust to Weight Ratio: 30
 Burn time: 493 s
 Propellants: Nuclear/LH2

Space Nuclear Thermal Propulsion Program

In contrast to the TIMBER WIND project, the Space Nuclear Thermal Propulsion (SNTP) program was intended to develop upper-stages for space-lift which would not operate within the Earth's atmosphere.  SNTP failed to achieve its objective of flight testing a nuclear thermal upper-stage, and was terminated in January 1994.  The program involved coordinating efforts across the Department of Defense, the Department of Energy, and their contractors from operating sites across the U.S. A major accomplishment of the program was to coordinate Environmental Protection Agency approvals for ground testing at two possible sites.  

The planned ground test facilities were estimated to cost $400M of additional funding to complete in 1992. Fewer than 50 sub-scale tests were planned over three to four years, followed by facility expansions to accommodate five to 25 1000 second full-scale tests of a 2000MW engine.

The program had technical achievements as well, such as developing high-strength fibers, and carbide coatings for Carbon-Carbon composites.  The hot-section design evolved to use all Carbon-Carbon to maximize turbine inlet temperature and minimize weight.  Carbon-Carbon has much lower nuclear heating than other candidate materials, so thermal stresses were minimized as well.  Prototype turbine components employing a 2-D polar reinforcement weave were fabricated for use in the corrosive, high-temperature hydrogen environment found in the proposed particle bed reactor (PBR)-powered engine. The particle bed reactor concept required significant radiation shielding, not only for the payload, electronics and structure of the vehicle, but also to prevent unacceptable boil-off of the cryogenic propellant.  A propellant-cooled, composite shield of Tungsten, which attenuates gamma rays and absorbs thermal neutrons, and Lithium Hydride, which has a large scattering cross section for fast and thermal neutrons was found to perform well with low mass compared to older Boron Aluminum Titanium Hydride (BATH) shields.  

Sandia National Labs was responsible for qualification of the coated particle fuel for use in the SNTP nuclear thermal propulsion concept.

References

External links
 Encyclopedia Astronautica link about the Timberwind 45
 Encyclopedia Astronautica link about the Timberwind 75
 Encyclopedia Astronautica link about the Timberwind 250
 Space Nuclear Thermal Propulsion Program Final Report 

Timberwind
United States government secrecy
1987 establishments in the United States
1994 disestablishments in the United States